Karl Fritzsch (10 July 1903 – reported missing 2 May 1945) was a German member of the Nazi secret police Schutzstaffel (SS) from 1933–1945. He was a deputy and acting commandant at the Auschwitz concentration camp. According to Rudolf Höss, Fritzsch first suggested using poisonous gas Zyklon B for the purpose of mass murder.

Early and personal life
Karl Fritzsch was born in Bohemia into the family of a stove builder. His father moved constantly on work assignments, so Fritzsch never received formal education. For some years he worked as a labourer on river ships along the Danube. His marriage in 1928 to Franziska Stich produced three children, but ended in divorce in 1942.

Nazi career

Fritzsch joined the Nazi Party and the SS (NSDAP # 261135 SS # 7287) in 1930 at the age of 27. He became a career SS man. Almost as soon as it opened, he acquired a position at the Dachau concentration camp in 1934.

Due to his camp experience, in May 1940 he became deputy to Rudolf Höss and head of the economic operation of Auschwitz (Schutzhaftlagerführer). Fritzsch quickly obtained a fearsome reputation in Auschwitz, selecting prisoners to die of starvation in reprisal for escape attempts. Together with Höss, he was responsible for the torture death of victims locked inside standing cells in the basement of the Bunker, i.e. the Block 11, or 13 prison, until they died. Fritzsch addressed the first 758 inmates of the camp, brought in June 1940, with the following words: "You came here not to a sanatorium, but to a German concentration camp, from which there is no other way out but through the chimney. If someone doesn't like it, they can go straight to the wires. If there are Jews in the transport, they have the right to live no longer than two weeks, priests a month, the rest three months." Another time he said: "For us, all of you are not human, but a pile of dung (...). For such enemies of the Third Reich as you, the Germans will have no favor and no mercy. We will be delighted to drive you all through the grates of the crematorium furnaces. Forget your wives, children and families, here you all savor like dogs."

On July 29, 1941, a camp count found that three prisoners were missing and Fritzsch sentenced 10 remaining prisoners to immurement.  One of the condemned, Franciszek Gajowniczek, was reprieved when a fellow prisoner, Franciscan priest Maximilian Kolbe, offered to take his place.  After over two weeks of starvation, only Kolbe remained alive. The priest was killed in the underground bunker by lethal injection.  Kolbe was later canonized by Pope John Paul II. Fritzsch was also fond of psychological torture.  Former Auschwitz prisoner Karol Świętorzecki recalled the first Christmas Eve behind the camp barbed wire, in 1940, was also one of the most tragic.  "The Nazis set up a Christmas tree, with electric lights, on the roll-call square. Beneath it, they placed the bodies of prisoners who had died while working or frozen to death at roll call. Lagerführer Karl Fritzsch referred to the corpses beneath the tree as 'a present' for the living, and forbade the singing of Polish Christmas carols."

According to testimony of his superior, Rudolf Höss, it was also Fritzsch who came up with the idea of using Zyklon B for the purpose of mass murder. Fritzsch ordered the killing of Soviet POWs locked in cells in the basement of the Bunker while Höss was on an official trip in late August 1941. Fritzsch tested Zyklon B inside cells that were not air-tight, subjecting the victims to even more torturous death. He repeated the tests on additional victims in the presence of Höss. According to Höss, the preferred method for the mass murders in Auschwitz using Zyklon B was devised on site.

On 15 January 1942, Fritzsch was transferred to KZ Flossenbürg as Schutzhaftlagerführer. From early August until October 1942 he was temporary substitute commander of the camp. In October 1943, he was arrested as a part of an internal SS investigation into corruption. An SS court charged him with murder. As a punishment he was transferred to front line duty (SS-Panzergrenadier-Ersatzbatallion 18). It is assumed that he fell during the battle of Berlin in May 1945.

Disappearance 
It is commonly believed that Fritzsch perished in the Battle for Berlin but his final fate remained long unknown. Soviet sources claimed that MI-6 caught him in Norway. In his 2007 memoirs, For He Is an Englishman, Memoirs of a Prussian Nobleman, Captain Charles Arnold-Baker recorded that as an MI6 officer in Oslo he arrested Fritzsch: "We picked up, for example, the deputy commandant of Auschwitz, a little runt of a man called Fritzsch whom we naturally put in the custody of a Jewish guard – with strict instructions not to damage him, of course."

On 4 May 2015 Dutch journalist  published an article on his investigation of Fritzsch's disappearance. In it he cites a report from 1966 by the Central Office of the State Justice Administrations for the Investigation of National Socialist Crimes in which Berlin inhabitant Gertrud Berendes claims that Fritzsch had shot himself on 2 May 1945 in the basement of a house at Sächsische Strasse 42 in Berlin. She mentioned that her father and a neighbour had buried Fritzsch in the Preussenpark and she had sent his personal belongings to his wife. In a separate report from 1966 by the Kriminalpolizei Regensburg, Fritzsch's wife states that she had no reason to doubt her husband's death and that she had received his wedding ring and personal letters.
However, Duk's book "De Beul en de Heilige" on Fritzsch that was supposed to be launched first at the end of 2015 and then in 2016 at publisher Prometheus, was postponed indefinitely and has since been removed from the publishers' list of forthcoming books.

References

Bibliography
 Staatliches Museum Auschwitz-Birkenau (Hrsg.): Auschwitz in den Augen der SS. Oświęcim 1998, 
 Ernst Klee: Das Personenlexikon zum Dritten Reich: Wer war was vor und nach 1945. Fischer-Taschenbuch-Verlag, Frankfurt am Main 2005,  
 Hermann Langbein: Menschen in Auschwitz. Frankfurt am Main, Berlin Wien, Ullstein-Verlag, 1980, 
 Jens-Christian Wagner: Produktion des Todes: Das KZ Mittelbau-Dora, Wallstein Verlag, Göttingen 2001, .
 Wacław Długoborski, Franciszek Piper (Hrsg.): Auschwitz 1940-1945. Studien zur Geschichte des Konzentrations- und Vernichtungslagers Auschwitz., Verlag Staatliches Museum Auschwitz-Birkenau, Oswiecim 1999, 5 Bände: I. Aufbau und Struktur des Lagers. II. Die Häftlinge - Existentzbedingungen, Arbeit und Tod. III. Vernichtung. IV. Widerstand. V. Epilog., .

1903 births
1945 deaths
1945 suicides
People from Aš
People from the Kingdom of Bohemia
German Bohemian people
Auschwitz concentration camp personnel
Dachau concentration camp personnel
Flossenbürg concentration camp personnel
SS-Hauptsturmführer
German people convicted of murder
People convicted of murder by Germany
Nazi concentration camp commandants
Waffen-SS personnel killed in action
Schutzhaftlagerführer
Nazis who committed suicide in Germany
Suicides by firearm in Germany
Missing in action of World War II